Colyers Hanger is a  biological Site of Special Scientific Interest south-east of Guildford in Surrey. It is a Nature Conservation Review site, Grade 2 and is part of St Martha's Hill and Colyer's Hanger nature reserve, which is managed by the Surrey Wildlife Trust.

This is an area of ancient forest on a south facing slope. It has a variety of woodland types due to the geological diversity of the escarpment at different levels. At the bottom is a stream with poorly drained woodland dominated by alder and a ground layer with plants such as marsh marigold and pendulous sedge.

Several public footpaths go through the site.

References

Sites of Special Scientific Interest in Surrey
Nature Conservation Review sites